Roman Signer (born 1938 in Appenzell, Switzerland) is principally a visual artist who works in sculpture, art installations photography, and video.

Early life and career
Born in Appenzell, Switzerland, Signer started his career as an artist later in life at the age of 28, after working as an architect’s draughtsman, a radio engineer apprentice, and a short stint in a pressure cooker factory. He holds degrees from arts institutions in Switzerland and Poland. He studied at the Schule für Gestaltung in Zurich and Lucerne between 1966 and 1971. He studied at the Academy of Fine Arts in Warsaw, Poland from 1971-1972.

Work

Signer's work has grown out of, and has affinities with both land art and performance art, but they are not typically representative of either category. It is often being described as following the tradition of the Swiss engineer-artist, such as Jean Tinguely and Peter Fischli & David Weiss.

Signer’s "action sculptures" involve setting up, carrying out, and recording "experiments" or events that bear aesthetic results. Day-to-day objects such as umbrellas, tables, boots, containers, hats and bicycles are part of Signer’s working vocabulary. Following carefully planned and strictly executed and documented procedures, the artist enacts and records such acts as explosions, collisions, and the projection of objects through space. Signer advocates ‘controlled destruction, not destruction for its own sake’. Action Kurhaus Weissbad (1992) saw chairs catapulted out of a hotel’s windows; Table (1994) launched a table into the sea on four buckets; Kayak (2000) featured the artist being towed down a road in a canoe. In documenta 8 (1987), he catapulted thousands of sheets of paper into the air to create an ephemeral wall in the room for a brief, but all the more intense moment. As the Swiss representative at the Venice Biennale in 1999, he made 117 steel balls fall from the ceiling on to lumps of clay lying on the ground.  Many of his happenings are not for public viewing, and are only documented in photos and film. Video works like Stiefel mit Rakete (Boot with Rocket) are integral to Signer’s performances, capturing the original setup of materials that self-destruct in the process of creating an emotionally and visually compelling event.

Signer gives a humorous twist to the concept of cause and effect and to the traditional scientific method of experimentation and discovery, taking on the self-evidence of scientific logic as an artistic challenge. As well as working in his studio, which he calls his lab, Signer often takes off to the Swiss mountains to conduct larger experiments. A recent example of his installation work was "Accident as sculpture" (Unfall als Skulptur)(2008) in which Signer had a three-wheeled delivery car, loaded with water barrels, roll down an 11 m high ramp and up the other side. At the apex, the vehicle overturned and crashed to the ground. The resulting chaotic arrangement constituted the exhibition at :de:Kunstraum Dornbirn. Another example, the video 56 Small Helicopters (56 Kleine Helikopter) (2008) shows a squadron of 56 remote-controlled toy helicopters as they rise into the air, collide with each other, carom off the ceiling and walls, and finally die in mechanical spasms on the floor.

In 2011, Signer showed Restenfilme or film leftovers, always presented in a darkened room furnished with several rows of wooden chairs, one of which rocks unassisted on its back legs. The projection gathers actions, which Signer never constituted as full artworks, as well as shots of locations that were possible staging grounds for potential works.

A collaborative film from 1996 with director Peter Liechti titled "Signer's Koffer" (English: "Signer's Suitcase") documents a series of his "action sculptures" along with interviews of Roman Signer and other characters encountered during his travels performing the work.

Exhibitions 
Signer's work has been shown at galleries and museums in Europe, North America and Asia over the last thirty years. It was featured in 37th Venice Biennale (1976), documenta 8, Kassel (1987), Skulptur Projekte Münster (1997), and minus20degree (2022).

In 2016 the Kunstmuseum Basel acquired 205 films of Roman Signer in Super 8 format. These films are among the most important works that make Signer's early performative work accessible. From April 1, 2017, 24 films from this collection will be presented to the public on 12 screens connecting the main building and the new building. The films shown were all produced between 1975 and 1989 and show the partial spectacular actions for which the artist has become known. No movie is longer than three minutes. Without sound, they show themes that are drawn by Signer's entire oeuvre: explosions and poetic moments, nature and its elements, staging and coincidence. Not infrequently the artist himself appears in it. They are sculptures on time, which sometimes offer a surprise effect and often reveal a humorous, almost slapsticky side.

Selected solo shows
 2015 Barbican Centre London, 'Slow Movement'
 2012 Kunsthalle Mainz
 2009 Kunsthaus Zug, Roman Signer - Werke 1975-2007
 2009 Hamburger Kunsthalle, Roman Signer -  Projektionen. Filme und Videos 1975 - 2008
 2008 Helmhaus Zürich, Roman Signer: Projektionen. Filme und Videos 1975 - 2008
 2008 Kunstraum Dornbirn, Installation. Unfall als Skulptur
 2008 Rochester Art Center, Roman Signer: Works
 2008 Hauser & Wirth London
 2007 Hamburger Bahnhof, Roman Signer – Werke aus der Friedrich Christian Flick Collection - Museum für Gegenwart, Berlin
 2007 Fruitmarket Gallery, Roman Signer – Works
 2006 Ludwig Forum für Internationale Kunst, Roman Signer. Kunstpreis Aachen 2006
 2006 Aargauer Kunsthaus, Roman Signer – Reisefotos
 2006 Galician Centre of Contemporary Art, Roman Signer. Esculturas e instalacións, Santiago de Compostela
2019 Château de Montsoreau-Museum of contemporary art, Roman Signer

Awards
 2010 Prix Meret Oppenheim
 2008 Finalist for the Hugo Boss Prize
 2008 Ernst-Franz-Vogelmann-Preis für Skulptur, Heilbronn
 2006 Kunstpreis Aachen
 2004 Kulturpreis der Stadt St. Gallen
 1998 Konstanzer Kunstpreis
 1998 Kulturpreis St. Gallen
 1998 Kulturpreis Konstanz
 1995 Kulturpreis Bregenz
 1977 Eidgenössisches Kunststipendium
 1974 Eidgenössisches Kunststipendium
 1972 Eidgenössisches Kunststipendium
 1972 Kiefer-Hablitzel Stipendium

Bibliography
 1999 Konrad Bitterli, Roman Signer, Venice Biennale and Walther König, Cologne
 2005 Gerhard Mack, Paula van den Bosch, Jeremy Millar, Roman Signer, Phaidon, London
 2008 Rachel Whiters, Roman Signer, DuMont, London
 2014 David Signer, Roman Signer: Talks and Conversations, Walther König, Cologne

Influences

A photo of Signer's "Wasser Stiefel" serves as the cover art of Upgrade & Afterlife (1996), an album by American experimental music group Gastr del Sol.

Notes

External links
 http://www.romansigner.ch/

1938 births
Living people
Swiss installation artists
Swiss contemporary artists